Nona Freeman (July 25, 1916 – December 26, 2009), was an American Oneness Pentecostal preacher; columnist, evangelist, author and missionary to Africa.

Biography
In 1948 Freeman and her husband E. L. (Bug) Freeman were the first United Pentecostal Church International (UPCI) missionaries to South Africa.  The couple served there for 41 years, returning to the United States every five to seven years to raise funds.

After the death of E.L. Freeman in 1999, Nona Freeman continued to travel as an evangelist and became a popular speaker among some Oneness Pentecostal groups.  In January 2009 Freeman suffered a stroke which lead to significant reduction of her previous schedule.  On December 8, 2009, Nona Freeman entered hospice care, dying at home on December 26, 2009.

References

External links
List of Nona Freeman's Books

1916 births
2009 deaths
American evangelists
Women evangelists
Oneness Pentecostalism
American Pentecostal pastors
Protestant missionaries in South Africa
American Pentecostal missionaries
Female Christian missionaries
American expatriates in South Africa